Srikrishna Alanahalli (3 April 1947 – 4 January 1989) was an Indian novelist and poet. The majority of his works are written in the Kannada language. He became popular for his novels Kaadu (1972), Parasangada Gendethimma (1978) and Bhujangayyana Dasavataragalu (1982), all of his novels were adapted into films.

Short Stories 

 Tapta
 Geejagana Goodu
 Finix
 Samagra Kathegalu
 Srikrishna Aalanahalli Sahitya Vachike — Ed: Vivek Shanbhag

Poetry

 Mannina Haadu
 Kaadu Gidada Haadu Paadu
 Dogri Pahaadi Premageetegalu

Novels 

 Kaadu/ಕಾಡು
 Parasangada Gendethimma
 Bujangayyana Dashavataragalu
 Gode (Sequel to Kaadu)

Novels/Short Stories Made into Movies

 Kaadu - Kannada Movie  (1973)
 Parasangada Gendethimma - Kannada Movie (1979)
 Geejagana Goodu — Kannada Movie (1975)
 Kurubara Lakkanoo Elizebheth Raaniyoo — Kannada Movie (1976)
 Bhujangayyana Dashavathara - Kannada Movie (1988)
Kannil Theriyum Kathaikal (Tamil)
Rosappu Ravikkaikari (Tamil)

References

External links 
 

1947 births
1989 deaths
Indian male novelists
People from Mysore district
20th-century Indian novelists
20th-century Indian poets
Indian male poets
Poets from Karnataka
Novelists from Karnataka
20th-century Indian male writers